The Communauté de communes du Santerre  is a former communauté de communes in the Somme département and in the Picardie région of France. It was created in December 1993. It was merged into the new Communauté de communes Terre de Picardie in January 2017.

Composition 
This Communauté de communes comprised 20 communes:

Bayonvillers
Beaufort-en-Santerre
Bouchoir
Caix
Chilly
Folies
Fouquescourt
Fransart
Guillaucourt
Hallu
Harbonnières
La Chavatte
Maucourt
Méharicourt
Parvillers-le-Quesnoy
Rosières-en-Santerre
Rouvroy-en-Santerre
Vrély
Warvillers
Wiencourt-l'Équipée

See also 
Communes of the Somme department

References 

Santerre